Calolamia bicordifera is a species of beetle in the family Cerambycidae, the only species in the genus Calolamia.

References

Acanthocinini